Adrian Czajkowski (spelled as Adrian Tchaikovsky for his books) is a British fantasy and science fiction author. He is known best for his series Shadows of the Apt, and for his novel Children of Time.

Children of Time was awarded the 30th Arthur C. Clarke Award in 2016. Author James Lovegrove described it as "superior stuff, tackling big themes – gods, messiahs, artificial intelligence, alienness – with brio".

Biography
Adrian Czajkowski was born in Lincolnshire in Woodhall Spa on 4 June 1972. He is of Polish descent. He studied zoology and psychology at the University of Reading. He then qualified as a legal executive. He was employed as a legal executive for the Commercial Dispute Department of Blacks, Solicitors, of Leeds. In late 2018 he became a full time writer.

He lives in Leeds with his wife and son.
 
In 2008, after Tchaikovsky had spent fifteen years trying to get published, his novel Empire in Black and Gold was published by Tor Books (UK)an imprint of Pan Macmillanin the United Kingdom. The series was later published in America by Pyr Books. Tchaikovsky expressed desire that the Polish editions of his novels feature the original Polish spelling of his surname, but these too used "Tchaikovsky".

On 23 January 2019, Tchaikovsky was awarded an Honorary Doctorate of the Arts by the University of Lincoln.

Career
Tchaikovsky revealed the basis of Shadows of the Apt in an online essay entitled "Entering the Shadows" at Upcoming4.me.

Whilst studying at the University of Reading he managed a role-playing game named Bugworld. The game concerned the story of the insect-people of the Lowlands, threatened by the encroaching Wasp Empire. From this original scenario the entire series of books grew.

Tchaikovsky still uses role-playing games to help develop his stories, but now also uses live action role-playing, which assists in describing the numerous action and battle sequences in his books. He is currently involved with the LARP game Empire.

Tchaikovsky has regularly expressed his intention regarding the Shadows of the Apt series not to make science better than magic, or vice versa: "This is another key element, really: the magic/tech divide is a concept that turns up here and there in fantasy, but usually one side is good (mostly magic) and the other (dirty polluting tech) is bad. With the world of the kinden, they’re basically both as bad as the people who use them, whether it’s blood sacrifice in a Mantis-kinden grove or the Wasp Empire’s city-levelling weaponry."

Awards and nominations
Tchaikovsky has received the following literary awards and nominations:
2016: Arthur C. Clarke Award for Children of Time (winner).
2017: British Fantasy Award – Best Fantasy Novel for The Tiger and the Wolf (winner).
2019: BSFA Award for Best Novel for Children of Ruin (winner).
2020: Sidewise Award for Alternate History - Long-form for The Doors of Eden (winner).
2020: Philip K. Dick Award for The Doors of Eden (nominee).
2021: BSFA Award for Best Novel for Shards of Earth (winner).
2022: Hugo Award for Best Novella nomination for Elder Race.

Bibliography

Novels
Shadows of the Apt
Main novels
 Empire in Black and Gold (2008), 
 Dragonfly Falling (2009), 
 Blood of the Mantis (2009), 
 Salute the Dark (2010), 
 The Scarab Path (2010), 
 The Sea Watch (2011), 
 Heirs of the Blade (2011), 
 The Air War (2012), 
 War Master's Gate (2013), 
 Seal of the Worm (2014), 

Tales of the Apt (short story collections in the Apt universe) Spoils of War (2016), ISBN 978-1910935217
 A Time for Grief (2017), ISBN 978-1910935217
 For Love of Distant Shores (2018), ISBN 978-1910935712
 The Scent of Tears (2018), ISBN 978-1910935712Children of Time
 Children of Time (2015), 
 Children of Ruin (2019), 
 Children of Memory (2022), 

Echoes of the Fall
 The Tiger and the Wolf (2016), 
 The Bear and the Serpent (2017), 
 The Hyena and the Hawk (2018), 

Bioforms
 Dogs of War (Head of Zeus, 2017), 
 Bear Head (Head of Zeus, 2021), 

The Final Architecture
 Shards of Earth (Tor, 2021), 
 Eyes of the Void (Tor, 2022), 
 Lords of Uncreation (Tor, expected 2023), 

Standalone novels
 Guns of the Dawn (2015), 
 Spiderlight (Tor.com, 2016), 
 Cage of Souls (Head of Zeus, 2019), 
 The Doors of Eden (2020), .
 City of Last Chances (2022), .

After the War seriesRedemption's Blade (Solaris Books, 2018), is the first book in a multi-author series. The series was continued with Salvation's Fire by Justina Robson and published on 4 September 2018.Warhammer 40,000

Tchaikovsky's first Warhammer 40,000 novel Day of Ascension (2022), like his short story "Raised in Darkness" from Inferno! Volume 6 (2021), concerns the insidious Genestealer Cults.

Novellas 

 Ironclads (Solaris Books, 2017), 
 The Expert System's Brother (Tor.com, 2018), 
 Walking to Aldebaran (Solaris Books, 2019), 
 Made Things (Tor.com, 2019), 
 Firewalkers (Solaris Books, 2020), 
 The Expert System's Champion (Tor.com, 2021), 
 One Day All This Will Be Yours (Solaris Books, 2021), 
 Elder Race (Tor.com, 2021), 
 Ogres (Solaris Books, 2022), 
 And Put Away Childish Things (Solaris Books, 2023), .

Short stories 

"The Final Conjuration" in Two Hundred and Twenty-One Baker Streets: An Anthology of Holmesian Tales Across Time and Space (Abaddon Books, 2014) , a collection of Sherlock Holmes short stories
"Where the Brass Band Plays" in Urban Mythic 2 (Alchemy Press, 2014), 
"Shadow Hunter" in Grimdark Magazine, issue #1

Other collections 

Feast and Famine (New Con Press, 2013), . This collection contains the stories "Feast and Famine", "The Artificial Man", "The Roar of the Crowd", "Good Taste", "The Dissipation Club", "Rapture", "Care", "2144 and All That", "The God Shark" and "The Sun in the Morning".

 The Private Life of Elder Things (2016), ISBN 978-1911034025. Co-authored by Keris McDonald and Adam Gauntlett. A collection of new Lovecraftian fiction about confronting, discovering and living alongside the creatures of the Mythos.

Critical studies and reviews of Tchaikovsky's work
The Doors of Eden

References

External links

Adrian Tchaikovsky official website

British fantasy writers
Living people
Alumni of the University of Reading
British science fiction writers
British people of Polish descent
People from Woodhall Spa
British male novelists
Sidewise Award winners
1972 births